Róbert Elek (born 13 June 1988) is a Romanian professional footballer who plays for Ciucaș Tărlungeni as a striker.

References

External links
 
 
 

1988 births
Living people
People from Târgu Secuiesc
Romanian footballers
Association football forwards
Liga I players
Liga II players
Liga III players
ASC Oțelul Galați players
AFC Dacia Unirea Brăila players
FC Bihor Oradea players
CSM Corona Brașov footballers
ACS Poli Timișoara players
FC Botoșani players
ASC Daco-Getica București players
CS Sportul Snagov players
CSA Steaua București footballers
SR Brașov players
Romanian football managers
SR Brașov managers